Girl Guides of Canada (GGC) is the national Guiding association of Canada. Guiding in Canada started on September 7, 1910, and GGC was among the founding members of the World Association of Girl Guides and Girl Scouts (WAGGGS) in 1928.

History

Mary Malcolmson organized the first Canadian Girl Guides Company to be officially registered in St. Catharines, Ontario; their registration is dated 1910-01-11. A park in St. Catharines was later named for Mary Malcolmson. Other Guide Companies were registered later in 1910 in Toronto, Moose Jaw and Winnipeg. The First Toronto Company held the first-recorded Girl Guide Camp in Canada on the banks of the Credit River in June 1911. By 1912, the movement had spread to all parts of Canada, and had become so popular that on 24 July 1912 Agnes Baden-Powell created Mary, Lady Pellatt "Chief Commissioner of the Dominion of Canada Girl Guides". Many Guide events were held at Lady Pellatt's home, Casa Loma, in Toronto. It is now a tourist attraction with a special Girl Guide display.

The first Canadian companies were constituted as part of the British Girl Guides Association. In 1917, the Parliament of Canada incorporated the organization under the name of "The Canadian Council of the Girl Guides Association". This Act has only been amended twice: first in 1947 to allow for the further acquisition of property, and later in 1961 to change the name to "Girl Guides of Canada".

In 1918 Newfoundland's first Guide Company was formed, even though the Province did not become part of Canada until 1949.

The Salvation Army adopted Guiding as part of its program for girls in 1937 when it became officially associated with the organization. Although the Army disassociated itself from the program in 1998, it continues to offer a form of Guiding to its girls.

A recent initiative Girl Guides of Canada has undertaken is called “Thought Leadership” in which they conduct research on the challenges and issues facing girls, and use this information to develop relevant programming. Their most recent report Sexism, Feminism & Equality: What Teens in Canada Really Think, released in October 2018, highlights how young people feel about gender inequality and how this inequality impacts their lives.

Guides franco-canadiennes  

In 1962 "Les Guides Catholiques du Canada (secteur français)" became a member of Girl Guides of Canada. This organization had originally been active only in the Province of Quebec but over the years had developed a small membership in other provinces. It had its own program, uniform and administration but acknowledged the Chief Commissioner of Canada as the head of Guiding in Canada and had membership in the World Association of Girl Guides and Girl Scouts. In 1992 "Les Guides Catholiques du Canada (secteur français)" became a separate, unaffiliated organization known as "Guides francophones du Canada". In 1995, they became officially affiliated with Girl Guides of Canada-Guides du Canada again, as "Les Guides franco-canadiennes". This affiliation ended in 2006.

Program
Girl Guides of Canada is the largest organization for women and girls in Canada. The membership is organized into different groups according to age. These are Sparks (ages 5 and 6), Embers (known as Brownies before 2023) (ages 7 and 8), Guides (ages 9 – 11), Pathfinders (ages 12 – 14), and Rangers (15-17+) .

The new program called Girls First was just launched in 2018 and is meant to be a catalyst for empowering girls.

There is also a program for girls who, for whatever reason, are not able to physically attend unit meetings. They are known as 'Lones' and complete the program of their branch by correspondence with a Lone Guider.

Two of Guiding's newest initiatives are Extra Ops and Trex. These programs are for members who have more specific interests (i.e. Camping or Hiking), Trex and Extra Ops programs are generally adopted by girls who are already a member of a branch of Guiding.

Adult women over the provincial age of majority are welcome in the organization as Leaders or Guiders. There are also places for volunteers in Public Relations, office jobs, and other important facets of the organization. A program for women ages 18–30 called "Link" is in place for young women who wish to retain or establish their ties with Guiding but who may not be able to give of their time to the extent of being a Guider. However, Link members are sometimes Guiders or will hold other positions within the organization as well.
Link members choose to meet when convenient to do so and will often participate in various Guiding events.

Adult members over the age of 30 have the option of becoming Trefoil Guild members. A woman can opt to be a member of the Trefoil Guild and participate in other roles within the organization. Trefoil Guild groups usually meet once or twice a month, and often participate in various Guiding events. Many Trefoil Guild members are senior citizens, some of whom have decades of Guiding experience.

Branches

Sparks
The Sparks program is for five and six-year-old girls. Like the other branches, they follow the Girls First program, which contains 8 program areas - Guide Together, Into the Outdoors, Build Skills, Explore Identities, Experiment and Create, Be Well, Connect and Question, and Take Action. Each program area has three themes. Sparks participate in a wide variety of activities with other girls of the same age. The Sparks uniform was originally a pink shirt with the Sparks promise, "I promise to share and be a friend.", printed on it, they now wear the same navy blue T-shirts as brownies through rangers. There is an optional white tie with pink maple leaves and an optional navy-blue badge sash. A Spark is a reference to a Celtic Fairy spirit, which would be encountered in natural areas such as forests.

Embers
Embers (previously known as Brownies) are 7 and 8-year-old girls. Embers aim to develop a sense of identity and a positive relationship with others by participating in a varied program of activities. Their uniforms used to be brown, then changed to orange and navy blue, then the uniform blue T-shirt with brown insets at the collar and sleeves. They now wear the same navy-blue t-shirt as the other branches. There is an optional white tie with brown maple leaves and an optional navy-blue badge sash. Like the other branches, they follow the Girls First program, which contains 8 program areas - Guide Together, Into the Outdoors, Build Skills, Explore Identities, Experiment and Create, Be Well, Connect and Question, and Take Action. Each program area has three themes. Embers can also work on optional discovery badges. The name Brownie was chosen as a reference to Celtic Fairy creatures that protect and do chores within a household or farm.
 In 2022, based on feedback from girls from racial minority backgrounds, the organization announced that the name would be replaced following a membership vote. In January 2023, GGC announced that Embers had won out over Comets. Local units were invited to adopt the new name immediately, with all web and print materials to be fully transitioned by September.

Guides
Guides are girls between 9 and 11 years of age. Guides are encouraged to do service projects to help their communities. Guides learn about people in other countries and are encouraged to discover and explore issues which are important to them. Their uniforms, originally navy blue, were then sky blue and navy blue, then the uniform blue shirts with navy blue insets and the collar and sleeves. They now wear the same navy-blue t-shirt as the other branches. There is an optional white tie with blue maple leaves and an optional navy-blue badge sash. Like the other branches, they follow the Girls First program, which contains 8 program areas - Guide Together, Into the Outdoors, Build Skills, Explore Identities, Experiment and Create, Be Well, Connect and Question, and Take Action. Each program area has three themes. Guides can also work on optional discovery badges.  Girls can earn their Lady Baden Powell Award, the highest achievement a Guide can earn. Occasionally Guides help sparks and brownies, earning a crests entitled "spark/brownie helper". Guides can go camping, canoe, have a sleepover, or help a local women's shelter.

Pathfinders

Pathfinders are girls between 12 and 14 years old. They focus on community service, leadership and camping. In Pathfinder units the girls are very independent and plan many camps, district camps, and meetings. Occasionally Pathfinders help sparks and brownies, earning a crests entitled " spark/brownie helper". The units are also usually very small, so the Pathfinders are usually close friends and very welcoming to new members. Their uniforms were green T-shirts, or white tee shirts, with the opposite colored sleeves, then uniform blue with green inserts on the collar and sleeves. They now wear the same navy-blue t-shirt as the other branches. There is an optional white tie with green maple leaves and an optional navy-blue badge sash. Like the other branches, they follow the Girls First program, which contains 8 program areas - Guide Together, Into the Outdoors, Build Skills, Explore Identities, Experiment and Create, Be Well, Connect and Question, and Take Action. Each program area has three themes. Girls can earn their Citizenship Certificate, their Community Service Award, and their Canada Cord, which consists of badgework, first aid, planning and leading an event or camp, doing activities with other branches, and earning the Citizenship Certificate and Community Service Award.  The Canada Cord requires a great commitment to guiding to be earned. Any girl registered in Girl Guides as a pathfinder is eligible to earn her Canada Cord award, regardless of how long she has been a member with Girl Guides of Canada.

Rangers
As of September 2008, girls between the ages of 15 and 17 (or older) are known as Rangers (prior to that date three branches of the GGC existed for youth in this age bracket: Rangers, Cadets and Junior Leaders, the latter two now defunct). They now wear the same navy-blue t-shirt as the other branches. There is an optional white tie with red maple leaves and an optional navy-blue badge sash. Like the other branches, they follow the Girls First program, which contains 8 program areas - Guide Together, Into the Outdoors, Build Skills, Explore Identities, Experiment and Create, Be Well, Connect and Question, and Take Action. Each program area has three themes. Rangers can earn their bronze, silver, or gold Trailblazer award. Rangers may also work on the Commonwealth Award or the Duke of Edinburgh Award. Adult leaders are there for guidance, but it is the Rangers who are responsible for planning and executing their activities.

Adults
Adult women can be a leader in a unit, or they can choose to be a member of Link or Trefoil Guild, depending on their age (Link 18-30 Trefoil must be 30+). Some members choose to participate in both functions.

Principles
The Guiding movement is based on the principles outlined in the Promise and Law. Every Guide makes this promise when she is enrolled. The Promise and Law were renewed in 1994, and on 13 January 2010, the current Promise was unveiled.

Promise (current)
I promise to do my best,
To be true to myself, my beliefs, and Canada.
I will take action for a better world
And respect the Guiding Law.

Promise (1994–2010)
I promise to do my best,
To be true to myself, my God/faith and Canada;
I will help others,
And accept the Guiding Law.
The word God or the word faith is chosen according to each girl's own personal convictions.
The Brownie Promise finishes with "And respect the Brownie Law".

Promise Guides (pre-1994)
I promise, on my honour, to do my best:
To do my duty to God, and the Queen, and my country,
To help other people everyday
And accept the Guiding Law.

Promise Brownies (pre-1994)
I promise to do my best:
To do my duty to God, the Queen, and my country.
To help other people everyday, especially those at home.

Spark Promise (current)
I promise to share and be a friend.

Law (current)
The Guiding Law challenges me to:
 Be honest and trustworthy
 Use my resources wisely
 Respect myself and others
 Recognize and use my talents and abilities
 Protect our common environment
 Live with courage and strength
 Share in the sisterhood of Guiding.

Guide Law (pre-1994)
 A Guide's honour is to be trusted.
 A Guide is loyal.
 A Guide is useful and helps others.
 A Guide is a friend to all and a sister to every Guide.
 A Guide is courteous.
 A Guide is kind to animals and enjoys the beauty in nature.
 A Guide is obedient.
 A Guide smiles and sings even under difficulty.
 A Guide is thrifty.
 A Guide is pure in thought, word, and deed.

Brownie Law (pre-1994)
A Brownie is cheerful and obedient.
A Brownie thinks of others before herself.

Girl Guide Cookies

Girl Guide Cookies are a tradition in Canada. Inspired by America's Girl Scout Cookies, they were first baked by a Guide leader, Christina Riepsamen, in Regina, Saskatchewan, in 1927. They were sold door-to-door, with a bag of 12 cookies costing 10 cents (equivalent to CA$ today), for the purpose of earning passenger rail fares for a camping trip to a lake. The sales were brisk, requiring extra batches to be baked to meet demand. It was then adopted as a simple way to raise money for uniforms and camping equipment.

In 1929, the National Headquarters began selling the cookies across Canada. Girl Guide cookies have gone through many recipe changes but the goals remain the same. Girl Guide cookies today are the largest fundraiser for the organization, and are used to help support the girls in their program and activities.

There are two different cookie campaigns, one in the fall and the other in the spring. The fall cookies are the chocolatey mint cookies, similar to the Girl Scout Thin Mints cookies sold in the United States. The classic vanilla and chocolate sandwich cookies are sold in the spring.

Manufactured by Christie's from 1960 to 2003, they are now made by Dare Foods Limited.  This was due to Christie's inability to meet the Girl Guides' new "nut-free" requirement.

According to, modern Girl Guide Cookie history began in 1946:
 1946—Introduction of vanilla crème cookie, maple cream and shortbread
 1949—The embossed trefoil on the cookies was introduced in Ontario. The supplier was Barker-Bredin. The price is 25 cents a box (equivalent to CA$ today).
 1953—A box of 24 cookies is 35 cents (CA$ today). The sandwich-type cookie, in vanilla & chocolate, is introduced
 1955—The cookie supplier becomes Weston's, Canada. Price rises to 40 cents a box (CA$ today).
 1960—The supplier changes to Christie's. They make a special sugar-topped cookie to celebrate the 50th Jubilee of Guiding in Canada
 1963—Girl Guides switches to plain cookies
 1966—Vanilla & chocolate sandwich-type cookies brought back
 1967—Canadian centennial cookies produced
 1968—The price rises to 50 cents a box (CA$ today)
 1985—Special cookies to celebrate 75 years of Guiding in Canada
 1993—Chocolate mint cookie introduced, starting in Ontario
 1995—Chocolate mint cookie introduced to all provinces
 2003—Supplier changes to Dare. They did face some complaints when the taste changed after the switch to Dare Foods.

Centenary
Guiding Mosaic 2010 was held in from 8–17 July at Guelph Lake Conservation Area in Southern Ontario. Over 2,500 girls and women attended the camp. Participants came from across Canada as well as from many countries, including Australia, Bangladesh, Jamaica, Japan, New Zealand and the United States.

On 8 July 2010, Canada Post made a stamp to commemorate the centennial of the Girl Guides.

References

External links
 Official website 
 Guides francocanadiennes 

World Association of Girl Guides and Girl Scouts member organizations
Scouting and Guiding in Canada
Youth organizations established in 1910
1910 establishments in Ontario